K40 may refer to:
 , a corvette of the Royal Navy
 , a destroyer of the Israeli Navy
 , a corvette of the Indian Navy
 Piano Concerto No. 3 (Mozart), by Wolfgang Amadeus Mozart
 Potassium-40, an isotope of potassium
 Redmi K40, a smartphone
 Toyota K40 transmission